Theodore Norman Clair "Ted N. C." Wilson (born May 10, 1950) is president of the General Conference (GC) of the Seventh-day Adventist (SDA) Church.

Family and Education 
Wilson was born in Takoma Park, Maryland on May 10, 1950 to Neal C. Wilson (GC president: 1979–1990) and Elinor E. Wilson. He and his wife, Nancy Louise Vollmer Wilson, have three daughters (Emile Louise, Elizabeth Esther, and Catherine Anne) and eleven grandchildren.

Wilson's education includes his receiving a Bachelor of Arts degree (religion and business administration) from Columbia Union College (now Washington Adventist University); a Master of Science degree (public health) from Loma Linda University; a Master of Divinity degree from Andrews University, and a Doctor of Philosophy degree (religious education) from New York University.

Career 
An ordained minister, Wilson began his church career in 1974 as a pastor in the Greater New York Conference and later as assistant director and director of Metropolitan Ministries there (1976–1981). He then worked in the Africa-Indian Ocean Division of the SDA Church (Abidjan, Cote d'Ivoire) until 1990, serving as a departmental director and later as executive secretary. After a two-year term as an associate secretary of the GC in Silver Spring, Maryland, Wilson became president of the Euro-Asia Division (Moscow, Russia), 1992–1996. After serving as president of the church's Review and Herald Publishing Association in Hagerstown, Maryland, he was elected a GC vice president in 2000.

At the 59th GC Session (2010) in Atlanta, Georgia, Wilson was elected to replace Jan Paulsen as president of the GC and was relected at the 60th GC Session (July 3, 2015) in San Antonio, Texas. Due to Covid-restrictions, the 61st GC Session (scheduled for 2020) was postponed until 6–11 June 2022 and held in St. Louis, Missouri, where Wilson was again reelected for another five-year term ending in 2025.

During his presidency of the GC, Wilson has been engaged in various denominational controversies over biblical, theological, political, and life-style issues, including the writings of Ellen White, creation-evolution, spiritual formation, last generation theology, the ordination of women in pastoral ministry, and human sexuality.

See also

 Seventh-day Adventist Church
 List of presidents of the General Conference of Seventh-day Adventists

References

1950 births
Living people
Andrews University alumni
American Christian Young Earth creationists
History of the Seventh-day Adventist Church
Loma Linda University alumni
People from Takoma Park, Maryland
Seventh-day Adventist administrators
American Seventh-day Adventist ministers
Seventh-day Adventist religious workers